Peasiella is a genus of sea snails, marine gastropod mollusks in the family Littorinidae, the winkles or periwinkles.

Species
Species within the genus Peasiella include:

 Peasiella conoidalis (Pease, 1868)
 Peasiella fasciata Reid & Mak, 1998
 Peasiella fuscopiperata (Turton, 1932)
 Peasiella habei Reid & Mak, 1998
 Peasiella infracostata (Issel, 1869)
 Peasiella isseli (Semper in Issel, 1869)
 Peasiella lutulenta Reid, 1989
 Peasiella mauritiana (Viader, 1951)
 Peasiella patula Reid & Mak, 1998
 Peasiella roepstorffiana (Nevill, 1885)
 Peasiella tantilla (Gould, 1849)
Species brought into synonymy
 Peasiella roepstorfii [sic]: synonym of Peasiella roepstorffiana (Nevill, 1885)
 Peasiella roosevelti Bartsch & Rehder, 1939: synonym of Echinolittorina porcata (Philippi, 1846)
 Peasiella templiana (Nevill, 1885): synonym of Peasiella roepstorffiana (Nevill, 1885)

References

 Reid D.G. (1989). Systematic revision of the Recent species of Peasiella Nevill, 1885 (Gastropoda: Littorinidae), with notes on the fossil species. The Nautilus 103(2): 43-69

Littorinidae